Warwick Leslie Gould,  (born 7 April 1947) is a literary scholar born in Sydney. He specializes in the Irish Literary Revival, particularly in the writings of W. B. Yeats, and in Textual Transmission studies and the History of the Book. Having studied at the University of Queensland, he joined Royal Holloway and Bedford New College in 1973 as a Lecturer in English Language and Literature. He became Professor of English Literature of the University of London (1994–2013) and was the Founding Director of the Institute of English Studies in the university's School of Advanced Study (1999–2013). He continues as Professor Emeritus since his retirement in 2013 and is a Senior Research Fellow of the institute.

Honours
In 1997, Gould was elected a Fellow of the Royal Society of Literature (FRSL). He was awarded the 2012 President's Medal by the British Academy: it is awarded "to recognise outstanding service to the cause of the humanities and social sciences". He is an Hon. Life Member of the Antiquarian Booksellers Association, and was elected to Fellowship of the Society of Antiquaries in 2022, and as an Honorary Foreign Corresponding Member of the Grolier Club of New York in the same year.

Selected works

References

1947 births
Historians of English literature
W. B. Yeats scholars
Australian academics
Academics of Royal Holloway, University of London
Fellows of the Royal Society of Literature
Recipients of the President's Medal (British Academy)
Living people